Robinsonia willingi is a moth in the family Erebidae. It was described by Travassos in 1964. It is found in Mexico.

References

Moths described in 1964
Robinsonia (moth)